The Tamil Nadu Horticultural Producers Co-operative Enterprises Limited (TANHOPE) was constituted with  the objective  to rto chanelise the central assistance in a larger scale 
to promote Horticulture.

History
 Tamil Nadu Horticulture Development Agency (TANHODA) was formed on 18.06.2004 vide G.O.Ms.No.91 (Agri) dated 27.03.2000 to channelise the central assistance in a larger scale to promote Horticulture.  It has been registered as a Society under Tamil Nadu Societies Registration Act 1975.

Functions And Powers of the Agency
The following are the Functions And Powers of the Board:

 TANHODA acts as a Special Purpose Vehicle for the purpose of implementing various schemes like National Horticulture Mission, Micro Irrigation, Precision Farming and National Bamboo Mission

Activities of Board 

 Training to Farmers and Staff
 Domestic and Export Market Intelligence Cell (DEMIC) was established in November 2004
 Publications: Tamil Nadu State Marketing Board published many useful books on various branches of Agriculture
 Exhibition

See also
 Agricultural produce market committee
 National Agricultural Cooperative Marketing Federation of India

References

External links
www.tanhoda.gov.in Official website

Other links

Marketing boards
Agricultural marketing in India
Horticultural organisations based in India
Agriculture in Tamil Nadu
Cooperatives in India
1995 establishments in Tamil Nadu
Indian companies established in 1995